Hilton Kuala Lumpur is a luxury hotel, located in Kuala Lumpur, Malaysia. It is part of the Hilton Hotels & Resorts hotel chain. The hotel is situated in the Kuala Lumpur Sentral area. At a height of 154 meters with 35 floors, the hotel is the 43rd tallest building in Malaysia. It is situated next to another hotel of the French chain Le Meridien, whose building's appearance is identical.

References

External links

 Kuala Lumpur Sentral
 Hilton Kuala Lumpur Sweeps Regional Awards
 TTG Travel Awards - TTG Asia

2004 establishments in Malaysia
Hotels in Kuala Lumpur
Hotel buildings completed in 2004